Charles "Dutch" Schesler [also spelled Schussler] (June 1, 1900 – November 19, 1953) was a German pitcher in Major League Baseball.

Schesler debuted in 1931 and appeared in relief in 17 games for the Philadelphia Phillies. He posted a 7.28 earned run average with 14 strikeouts and 18 walks in  innings pitched without any wins or losses.

Schesler was interred at Harrisburg Cemetery.

See also

List of Major League Baseball players from Europe

References

External links
Career statistics and player information from Baseball-Reference, or Baseball Cube, or Retrosheet

1900 births
1953 deaths
Albany Senators players
Burials at Harrisburg Cemetery
Galveston Buccaneers players
Harrisburg Senators players
Hornell Maples players
Johnstown Johnnies players
Knoxville Smokies players
Major League Baseball pitchers
Major League Baseball players from Germany
Minor league baseball managers
Newark Bears (IL) players
Oklahoma City Indians players
Philadelphia Phillies players
Providence Grays (minor league) players
Reading Keystones players
Scottdale Scotties players
Scranton Miners players
Shamokin Indians players
Spartanburg Spartans players
Sportspeople from Frankfurt
Baseball players from Harrisburg, Pennsylvania
Springfield Hampdens players
St. Hyacinthe Saints players
Wilkes-Barre Barons (baseball) players
Williamsport Grays players
York White Roses players